Pseudocalamobius is a genus of beetles in the family Cerambycidae, containing the following species:

 Pseudocalamobius bhutanensis Breuning, 1975
 Pseudocalamobius bispinosus Breuning, 1940
 Pseudocalamobius burmanensis Breuning, 1949
 Pseudocalamobius ceylonensis Breuning, 1940
 Pseudocalamobius discolineatus Pic, 1927   
 Pseudocalamobius diversus Breuning, 1948
 Pseudocalamobius filiformis Fairmaire, 1888
 Pseudocalamobius flavolineatus Breuning, 1940
 Pseudocalamobius incertus Breuning, 1940
 Pseudocalamobius japonicus (Bates, 1873)
 Pseudocalamobius javanicus Breuning, 1948
 Pseudocalamobius leptissimus Gressitt, 1936
 Pseudocalamobius lobatus Breuning, 1940
 Pseudocalamobius luteonotatus Pic, 1908
 Pseudocalamobius montanus Hayashi, 1959
 Pseudocalamobius niisatoi Hasegawa, 1987
 Pseudocalamobius obscuriscapus Breuning, 1975
 Pseudocalamobius okinawanus Samuelson, 1965
 Pseudocalamobius piceus Gressitt, 1951
 Pseudocalamobius proximus Breuning, 1940
 Pseudocalamobius pubescens Hasegawa, 1987
 Pseudocalamobius rondoni Breuning, 1964
 Pseudocalamobius rufescens Breuning, 1940
 Pseudocalamobius seriemaculatus Breuning, 1940
 Pseudocalamobius strandi Breuning, 1940
 Pseudocalamobius szetschuanicus Breuning, 1947
 Pseudocalamobius taiwanensis Matsushita, 1931
 Pseudocalamobius talianus Pic, 1916
 Pseudocalamobius truncatus Breuning, 1940
 Pseudocalamobius tsushimae Breuning, 1961
 Pseudocalamobius yunnanus Breuning, 1942

References

Agapanthiini